Robert Rock (born 6 April 1977) is an English professional golfer. He played on the European Tour from 2003 to 2022. He has won twice on the tour, the 2011 BMW Italian Open and the 2012 Abu Dhabi HSBC Golf Championship. He lost to Irish amateur Shane Lowry in a playoff at the 2009 3 Irish Open, but still collected the first prize of €500,000.

Early life
Rock was born in Armitage, near Lichfield in Staffordshire, and grew up and was educated in nearby Rugeley.

Professional career
Rock joined the European Tour as an affiliate member in 2003. His breakthrough season was 2009, when he managed three second-place finishes, including at the Irish Open, where he tied for first place but lost to Irish amateur Shane Lowry at the third hole of a sudden-death playoff, but collected the first prize of €500,000. He finished the 2009 season ranked in the top thirty of the Race to Dubai. He finished tied for 7th place in the 2010 Open Championship, despite a second round 78 played in very windy conditions.

Rock won his maiden European Tour title at the BMW Italian Open in Turin in June 2011. He won by one stroke over Gary Boyd and Thorbjørn Olesen despite a final round 62 from Olesen. He made his U.S. Open debut the following week, having qualified via a European sectional qualifying event. Because of difficulties in obtaining a visa, he only arrived in the United States at 3:30am on the Thursday morning, less than 12 hours before the start of his round. Despite this, he managed an under-par opening round of 70 and finished tied for 23rd place at 3 under par.

Rock won his second European Tour title at the 2012 Abu Dhabi HSBC Golf Championship, finishing one shot ahead of Rory McIlroy. He entered the final round at 11 under par, tied for the lead with Tiger Woods, but outshone the American on Sunday to shoot a 2 under round of 70 to claim victory. After the win he rose to a career-high 55 in the world rankings.

Since his 2012 win, his best finish has been a runner-up finish behind Paul Casey in the 2013 Irish Open.

He was well known as one of the few professional golfers that did not wear a hat while he played, despite the sponsorship income it can bring. However, ValueLicensing became the first company to sponsor his cap in 2016, although it was a flat cap not a traditional golfers hat that he wears.

On 6 July 2019, Rock shot a 10-under-par 60 at Lahinch Golf Club in the third round of the Dubai Duty Free Irish Open. This score set an Irish Open record and a Rolex Series record. Rock had 35 feet left for eagle from the fringe at Lahinch's par-5 18th hole, but missed just left. Rock, who shot 7-under 29 on the back nine, was 13 under for the championship and led Rafa Cabrera-Bello (63) and Eddie Pepperell (66) by a shot entering the event's final round. Rock shot a final round 70 and finished the event tied for 4th.

In October 2022, Rock announced his retirement from professional golf.

Professional wins (3)

European Tour wins (2)

European Tour playoff record (0–1)

Other wins (1)
2001 Farmfoods British Par 3 Championship

Playoff record
Challenge Tour playoff record (0–1)

Results in major championships

 

CUT = missed the half-way cut
"T" = tied

Summary

Most consecutive cuts made – 3 (2010 Open Championship – 2011 Open Championship)
Longest streak of top-10s – 1

Results in World Golf Championships

QF, R16, R32, R64 = Round in which player lost in match play
"T" = Tied

Team appearances
Professional
Seve Trophy (representing Great Britain & Ireland): 2009 (winners), 2011 (winners)

See also
2005 European Tour Qualifying School graduates

References

External links

Robert Rock Profile

English male golfers
European Tour golfers
Sportspeople from Lichfield
1977 births
Living people